Good old days is a cliché in popular culture used to reference a time considered by the speaker to be better than the current era. It is a form of nostalgia which can reflect homesickness or yearning for long-gone moments.

There is a predisposition, caused by cognitive biases such as rosy retrospection, a form of survivorship bias, for people to view the past more favourably and future more negatively.

Notable uses

In literature
In 1726, John Henley used this phrase in his book The Primitive Liturgy "to all honest Admirers of the good old Days of their best and wisest Fore-fathers, this first Part of the Primitive Liturgy Is most humbly dedicated".

In 1727, Daniel Defoe wrote in The Complete English Tradesman "In the good old days of Trade, which our Fore-fathers plodded on in." In this part of his book, Defoe talks about how in 'the good old days' tradesman were better off than in Defoe's time.

In music
In 2015, musical duo Twenty One Pilots released Stressed Out, a song that pinpointed the return to the 'good old days'. It won the Grammy for Best Pop Duo/Group Performance in February 2017. As of August 2021, the official music video on YouTube has been viewed 2.3 billion times.

See also
 Golden age (metaphor)
Nostalgia
Communist nostalgia
Southern nostalgia
Sociological Francoism

References

Nostalgia
Phrases